Jochen Alexander Schropp (born 22 November 1978 in Lahn-Giessen, Hesse) is a German actor and television host.

Biography
Schropp was born in 1978 as the child of a teacher and a medical assistant in the former municipality of Gießen in the city of Lahn. After his high school year in Visalia, California, where Schropp gained his first acting experience, he played at the American theater in Giessen. In addition, he also worked as a small actor, extras and in advertising and began training as a vocalist and speaker at the Hessischer Rundfunk in Frankfurt. After graduating from high school at the Weidigschule in Butzbach, Schropp did his community service in a dialysis center in Giessen. After a musical workshop in Hamburg, he studied at Paul McCartney's Liverpool Institute for Performing Arts (LIPA) in the United Kingdom for two and a half years. However, Schropp ended the training prematurely. In 2000, he reported on the Love Parade for RTL Zwei.

He received his first major role in the ARD evening series Sternenfänger, in which he played together with Nora Tschirner, Oliver Pocher and Florentine Lahme. Since then he has participated in script readings, works as a speaker and presenter, for example at the Max-Ophuls-Preis film festival in Saarbrücken or as a presenter for the presentation of the short film bear at the Berlinale. In March 2005 he played a role in the comedy Popp Dich slim!, for which he had to gain twelve kilograms of body mass. At the end of 2006 he had a role in the ARD series Zwei Engel für Amor, which in the following year for the Adolf Grimme Prize was nominated. Since 2007, he has also played leading roles in various ZDF television films and embodied the forensic specialist in Polizeiruf 110 in Halle in eight episodes.

In addition to acting, he moderated for Berlin lifestyle web TV Luxity.TV and devoted himself more and more to moderation. From 2010 to 2012 he moderated the German version of X Factor for VOX. In 2014 he switched to ProSiebenSat.1 Media. There he replaced Oliver Pocher and Cindy aus Marzahn as the new host of the Promi Big Brother. On Sat.1 he also moderated the improcomedy show Jetzt wird’s schräg, as well as the game show Himmel oder Hölle on ProSieben. In 2020 he moderated the thirteenth season of the German show Big Brother on Sat.1.

Personal life and social engagement
He has lived in Berlin since 2001 and has been in a relationship with his partner since spring 2018. Since 2009 he has been supporting the SOS Children's Villages. He regularly visits SOS projects to see the work on site for himself. In 2012 he donated his profits from the TV show Promi-Kocharena to the organization and also supported it in 2014 by hosting the preview of the musical Das Wunder von Bern.

Filmography
2001: Abschnitt 40
2002: Sternenfänger
2002: Der Fussfesselmörder
2002: Wozu Freunde?!
2003: Kleiner Matrose
2003: Der kleine Mönch
2004: Der schönste Tag im Leben
2005–2006: Alphateam – Die Lebensretter im OP (26 episodes)
2005: Leonys Aufsturz
2005: Popp Dich schlank!
2006: Außergewöhnlich
2006: Zwei Engel für Amor
2006: In aller Freundschaft: Mein fremder Mann
2006: SOKO Leipzig: Maskenball
2007: Kein Geld der Welt
2007: Rosamunde Pilcher – Sieg der Liebe
2007: Polizeiruf 110 – Taximord
2008: Polizeiruf 110 – Wolfsmilch
2008: Inga Lindström – Rasmus und Johanna
2008: Meine wunderbare Familie
2008: Hallo Robbie! – Sturzflüge
2008: Rosamunde Pilcher – Eine Liebe im Herbst
2008: Polizeiruf 110 – Der Tod und das Mädchen
2008: Kreuzfahrt ins Glück – Hochzeitsreise nach Florida
2008: Großstadtrevier: Der Hafenpastor – Der Schein trügt
2008: Polizeiruf 110 – Fehlschuss
2009: Eine für alle – Frauen können's besser
2009: Polizeiruf 110 – Triptychon
2009: Der Bergdoktor – Zwischen den Stühlen
2009: Polizeiruf 110 – Schatten
2009: Polizeiruf 110 – Der Tod und das Mädchen
2009: Polizeiruf 110 – Tod im Atelier
2010: Polizeiruf 110 – Kapitalverbrechen
2010: Countdown – Die Jagd beginnt – Der Bruch
2010: Polizeiruf 110 – Risiko
2011: Lindburgs Fall
2012: Notruf Hafenkante – Ein letzter Kuss
2012: Polizeiruf 110 – Raubvögel
2013: Rosamunde Pilcher – Die versprochene Braut
2014: Kreuzfahrt ins Glück – Hochzeitsreise nach Dubai
2015: Mila
2015: Notruf Hafenkante – Endlich schlank
2015: Welcome All Sexes: 30 Jahre Teddy Awards – dokumentarisches Format
2017: Im Knast
2017: Schatz, nimm Du sie!
2017: Rosamunde Pilcher – Fast noch verheiratet
2019: Bettys Diagnose – Herz oder Verstand
2020: Schwester, Schwester

Moderation

Current
Since 2014: Promi Big Brother, Sat.1 – with Marlene Lufen (since 2018)
Since 2018: Sat.1-Frühstücksfernsehen, Sat.1
Since 2020: United Voices – Das größte Fanduell der Welt, Sat.1 – with Sarah Lombardi
Since 2020: Ranking the Stars, Sat.1
Since 2020: Die Festspiele der Reality-Stars – Wer ist die hellste Kerze?, Sat.1 – with Olivia Jones

Former
2010–2012: X Factor, RTL/VOX
2011: Jeder Stein zählt – Die LEGO Familienshow, VOX
2011: Wer is(s)t besser?, VOX
2012: Ein Bus voller Bräute, VOX
2012: Das perfekte Model: Die Final-Show, VOX
2012–2016: Teddy Award, Arte
2013: Gewinne ein neues Leben – Die Auswanderershow, VOX
2013: Die tierischen 10, VOX – with Martin Rütter
2013: Grill den Henssler, VOX
2014: Tohuwabohu, ZDFneo
2014–2015: Himmel oder Hölle, ProSieben
2014–2015: Science of Stupid – Wissenschaft der Missgeschicke, National Geographic Channel
2014–2016: Jetzt wird’s schräg, Sat.1
2015: Plötzlich Krieg? – Ein Experiment, ZDFneo
2015: Die große Revanche, Sat.1
2016: Reingelegt – Die lustigsten Comedy-Fallen, Sat.1
2017: Schropp Lass Nach! – Web-Format, YouTube-Kanal World Wide Wohnzimmer
2017: Duell der Stars – Die Sat.1 Promiarena, Sat.1
2017: Bist du 50.000 Euro wert?, ZDFneo
2017: Schätzen Sie mal, Das Erste
2017–2018: Das gibt’s doch gar nicht!, Sat.1 (2017) / Sat.1 Emotions (2018)
2019: Endlich Feierabend!, Sat.1
2020: Promis unter Palmen – Die große Aussprache, Sat.1
2020: Big Brother, Sat.1 – 13th season

References

External links

 

1978 births
Living people
People from Giessen
German male television actors
Sat.1 people
ProSieben people
German LGBT broadcasters
German gay actors